Keith Sutherland Palmer (29 November 1919 – 2 July 2008) was an Australian rules footballer who played with Geelong and Footscray in the Victorian Football League (VFL).

Sutherland served in the Australian Army during World War II, playing for Geelong in 1941 while serving, and then playing for Footscray after his discharge in May 1943.

References

External links 
		

1919 births
2008 deaths
Australian rules footballers from Victoria (Australia)
Geelong Football Club players
Western Bulldogs players
Golden Point Football Club players